The Collaborative Computational Projects (CCP) group was responsible for the development of CCPForge, which is a software development tool produced through collaborations by the CCP community. CCPs allow experts in computational research to come together and develop scientific software which can be applied to numerous research fields. It is used as a tool in many research and development areas, and hosts a variety of projects. Every CCP project is the result of years of valuable work by computational researchers.

It is advised for projects to have one application, this helps users to search a category and classification system so they can find the right project for their work. Furthermore, the project can be under up to three CCPs provided it is a collaboration. Each classification category will have sub-sections to filter the category further. CCPForge projects, such provide essential information which has been used in publications such as 'Recent developments in R-matrix applications to molecular processes' and 'Ab initio derivation of Hubbard models for cold atoms in optical lattices', in which codes from CCPQ were used.

The Joint Information Systems Committee (JISC) and EPSRC both fund the CCPForge project. The Scientific Computing Department (SCD) of the Science and Technology Facilities Council is responsible for the development and maintenance of CCPForge, and this is funded by a long term support grant from EPSRC.

Current Projects 

* CCPQ was formed from CCP2 "Continuum States of Atoms and Molecules", incorporating aspects of CCP6 "Molecular Quantum Dynamics".

References 

Engineering and Physical Sciences Research Council
Jisc
Science and Technology Facilities Council
Science and technology in Oxfordshire
Computational physics
Computational chemistry